The Fox River is a river in Thunder Bay District in Northwestern Ontario, Canada. It is in the Great Lakes Basin and is a right tributary of the Pukaskwa River, which it enters within Pukaskwa National Park.

Course
The river begins at an unnamed lake and flows southwest into Partridge Lake and then onward into Fox Lake. It continues southwest, enters Pukaskwa National Park, and reaches its mouth at the Pukaskwa River, which flows to Lake Superior.

See also
List of rivers of Ontario

References

Sources

Rivers of Thunder Bay District